Hoàng Hiệp (1 October 1931, in Chợ Mới – 9 January 2013, in Saigon) was a Vietnamese songwriter. He was a recipient of the Hồ Chí Minh Prize in 2000.

References 

People from An Giang Province
Vietnamese composers
1931 births
2013 deaths
Ho Chi Minh Prize recipients